Snow White: A Tale of Terror is a 1997 American gothic fantasy horror film based on the fairy tale of the same name. It was directed by Michael Cohn and stars Sigourney Weaver, Sam Neill and Monica Keena. It premiered on Showtime on August 24, 1997.

Plot
  
As Lord Frederick Hoffman and his pregnant wife Lilliana are travelling home by carriage through the woods, they are accosted by a pack of wolves that attack both the horses and the coachman. In the chaos, Lilliana is fatally wounded and goes into labor; at his dying wife's urging, Frederick reluctantly performs a caesarean section to save their unborn daughter.

Years later, the young Lilli Hoffman, named after her late mother, plays mischievously on the grounds of the Hoffman estate. Frederick remarries a noble woman named Lady Claudia. Despite Claudia's kindness to her, Lilli is resentful towards her new stepmother, not even thanking Claudia for her gift of a Rottweiler puppy. On the Hoffmans' wedding night, Lilli runs from her nursemaid and hides under Claudia's bed. While searching for Lilli, the nursemaid is mysteriously killed by an unseen force when she looks into Claudia's ornate wardrobe mirror, which was passed down from her mother, a practitioner of witchcraft.

Nine years later, Lilli has grown into a beautiful but self-centered young woman. She still resents Claudia, now pregnant with her first child, despite her best efforts to be kind to Lilli. The Hoffmans throw a ball to celebrate the impending birth of Frederick and Claudia's son. Claudia gives Lilli a gown to wear to the ball that belonged to her as a child. Lilli rebuffs the gift and rebels by wearing one of her own mother's gowns to the ball, directing all the guests' attention to her and away from Claudia. Frederick is first startled, then pleased at Lilli's evocation of her mother. As the two dance, a hurt and jealous Claudia becomes so distressed that she goes into an early labor and delivers a stillborn boy. Dr. Peter Gutenberg, the Hoffmans' physician, informs Frederick that the stillbirth has rendered Claudia infertile. Distraught, she is soon corrupted by the power of the mirror and swears revenge on Lilli.

The next morning, a remorseful and sympathetic Lilli attempts to make peace with Claudia, who appears to forgive her. Dr. Gutenberg proposes to Lilli, who happily accepts; he goes to ask for her father's consent. While waiting for him, she is confronted by Claudia's mute brother Gustav, who tries to kill her per Claudia's orders but she escapes deep into the woods. Gustav then resorts to killing a boar instead and presents its heart to Claudia, who orders him to place the rest of the remains in the stew pot intended for the Hoffmans' dinner, which she later eats with wicked relish.  However, when she coughs up the boar's blood, she realizes that Gustav has failed her. Enraged at his betrayal, she bewitches Gustav, which causes him to have horrific hallucinations that drive him to suicide.  Frederick and the household search for Lilli in the woods, but Frederick falls from his horse and is injured.

In the meantime, Lilli is found by seven rough, combative miners, led by Will, who grudgingly take her under their wing. One of them attempts to rape Lilli, but is stopped by Will and thrown out. Claudia makes another attempt on Lilli's life using witchcraft to crush her in the mines, but Lilli escapes and one of the miners, Gilbert, is killed instead. Dr. Gutenberg returns to the castle to find it almost abandoned save for Claudia, who, in an attempt to get rid of him, seduces and pleads with him to find Lilli.

Claudia again uses witchcraft to lure Lilli to her death by summoning a gale to knock down the trees and crush her to death. Lilli is almost crushed when she tries to save Lars, one of the miners, but she is pulled to safety by Will and Lars is killed. One of the miners, Scar, spots a raven that had been following them and kills it after realizing it was bewitched. Under the mirror's influence, Claudia decides to deal with Lilli later and focuses on resurrecting her dead son in a ritual that requires her to "steal the father's seed and bathe the child in the father's blood". She then makes her way to the injured Frederick's bedchamber and rapes him. In the forest, while the four remaining miners mourn their losses, Lilli notices Will's scars, inflicted by Crusaders. Having fallen in love, the two share a kiss.

Claudia disguises herself as a crone and turns her brother's eviscerated heart into a poisoned apple. Transported to Lilli's refuge, she deceives her into accepting the apple, which puts her into a deathlike state. Will finds Lilli seemingly dead on the ground from a bite of the apple. Dr. Gutenberg eventually finds them and sadly pronounces her dead. The miners place her in a glass coffin and prepare to bury her. Will notices that her eyes have opened and pulls Lilli's body from the coffin, shaking her as he commands her to breathe, dislodging the piece of apple that had been stuck in her throat. In the castle, Claudia takes Frederick to the chapel, ties him to a crucifix and suspends it upside down, preparing to exsanguinate him to complete the resurrection of her son.

Gutenberg takes Lilli back to the castle to stop Claudia and rescue Frederick, followed by Will. On arriving, they discover that the entire household has been placed under a spell, rendering them mindless and feral. They find a weak and delirious Frederick, who believes Lilli to be a ghost, and Will takes him outside to safety. Claudia kills Gutenberg by pushing him out a window.

Lilli then finds Claudia cradling her newly revived but weak baby. The two engage in a fight, during which Claudia slams Lilli's head into a mirror and sadistically cuts her face with one of the shards. When Lilli accidentally sets the room on fire, Claudia becomes distracted by her son's cries of distress.  This allows Lilli to grab a dagger and stab the mirror, wounding both Claudia and her reflection. Claudia removes the dagger from the mirror and is horrified to see her appearance transform to that of an old woman. The mirror then cracks and explodes; shards of glass go flying in Claudia’s face, causing her to accidentally step backwards into the path of the fire, setting her ablaze. As Claudia screams and flails helplessly around the room, she falls over the nearby burning bed, which crashes down on top of her and kills her. Lilli then joins Will and Frederick outside. Her father finally comes to and is overjoyed to see her again. The film ends with snow falling on the trio.

Cast

 Sigourney Weaver as Claudia Hoffman
 Sam Neill as Frederick Hoffman
 Monica Keena as Lilli Hoffman
 Gil Bellows as Will
 David Conrad as Peter Gutenberg
 Miroslav Táborský as Gustav
 Brian Glover as Lars
 Andrew Tiernan as Scar
 Anthony Brophy as Rolf
 Chris Bauer as Conrad
 Frances Cuka as Nannau
 Bryan Pringle as Father Gilbert
 Taryn Davis as Little Lilli 
 Joanna Roth as Lilliana
 John Edward Allen as Bart
 Dale Wyatt as Maidservant Ilsa

Production
In 1995, David Conrad got an offer to play "a decoy Prince Charming" in Snow White in the Black Forest, in his last year in the graduate theater program at the Juilliard School. Shooting for the film started in 1995 on locations in Prague, Barrandov Studios, and castles around the Czech Republic including Kost, Dobřichovice, Pernštejn, and Valdek. Stromovka Park was used as the Black Forest. Shooting was reportedly continuing in May 1996.

Reception

Critical reception
On Rotten Tomatoes, 55% of 11 critic reviews are positive for the film, with an average rating of 6/10.

Awards
 Nominated — 3 Primetime Emmy Awards
Outstanding Lead Actress in a Miniseries or a Movie: Sigourney Weaver
Outstanding Costume Design for a Miniseries or a Movie: Marit Allen, Charles Knode
Outstanding Makeup for a Miniseries, Movie or a Special: Ann Brodie, Linda DeVetta
Nominated — 1 Screen Actors Guild Award
Outstanding Performance by a Female Actor in a TV Movie or Miniseries: Sigourney Weaver
Nominated — 1 Saturn Award
Best Television Presentation: Snow White: A Tale of Terror
Nominated — 1 American Society of Cinematographers Award
Outstanding Achievement in Cinematography in Movies of the Week/Pilots: Mike Southon
Nominated — 1 CableACE Award
Cinematography in a Movie or Miniseries: Mike Southon

Home media
Snow White: A Tale of Terror was initially released on VHS, as well as a DVD edition in the United States on August 25, 1998 via Polygram. It was re-issued on DVD from Universal Home Entertainment on August 13, 2002, containing identical artwork to the previous edition and most recently on May 1, 2012 from Universal, containing newly commissioned artwork. A multipack DVD including the film (with Darkman II: The Return of Durant and Firestarter 2: Rekindled) was made available from Universal.

In the United Kingdom, Universal Home Entertainment released the film on VHS format on June 1, 1998, while a re-issued VHS became available via Universal from September 17, 2001. The film has been issued twice on DVD from Universal Home Entertainment in the UK, with the first on February 6, 2006, and a subsequent version containing new artwork on May 14, 2012. All editions from Universal are now out-of-print as distribution company Fabulous Films currently acquire ownership rights for distribution in the United Kingdom. Fabulous released the film on April 4, 2016 on DVD, and for the first time in any country, on Blu-ray format on July 4, 2016.

The film is additionally available to rent or buy on Amazon Video.

The film finally debuted on Blu-ray in the United States for the first time on October 6, 2020 by Mill Creek Entertainment. The disc contains no extras.

Notes

References

External links 
 
 
 
 

1997 films
1990s supernatural horror films
1997 fantasy films
1997 independent films
American supernatural horror films
Supernatural fantasy films
American independent films
American dark fantasy films
Films scored by John Ottman
1997 horror films
Films based on Snow White
Horror films based on children's franchises
Films shot in the Czech Republic
Interscope Communications films
PolyGram Filmed Entertainment films
Films about witchcraft
Fratricide in fiction
Poisoning in film
Films based on fairy tales
Films set in forests
1990s English-language films
1990s American films